"Don't Put Your Spell on Me" is the eighth solo single by Ian McNabb. The single was the first to be released from the album Merseybeast. It charted at number 72 on the UK Singles Chart.

Track listings

CD
 "Don't Put Your Spell on Me" (4:37)
 "Don't Patronise Me" (4:07)
 "What She Did to My Mind" (7:31)

7" & cassette
 "Don't Put Your Spell on Me" (4:37)
 "Don't Patronise Me" (4:07)

Music video

The music video depicts gothic scenes, and McNabb being stalked by a sinister looking man.

References

1996 singles
Ian McNabb songs
1996 songs